The following are lists of islands that are part of, or claimed by, Argentina.

The list is divided into three parts.  The first part is those islands that are not disputed.  The second part is the Falkland Islands and South Georgia and the South Sandwich Islands, which are claimed by Argentina but are United Kingdom sovereign overseas territories (see Falkland Islands sovereignty dispute; South Georgia and the South Sandwich Islands sovereignty dispute).

The third part is the Argentine claim to Antarctica which overlaps both the British and Chilean Antarctic claims. All three countries are signatories to the Antarctic Treaty.

Undisputed
These are islands currently administered by Argentina

Falkland Islands, and South Georgia and the South Sandwich Islands

The Falkland Islands and South Georgia and the South Sandwich Islands are United Kingdom sovereign territories claimed by Argentina.

Antarctica

Argentina's claim to Antarctica overlaps with the claims of Chile and the United Kingdom.  All these claims are subject to the Antarctic Treaty and none have gained wide international recognition.

See also

Argentina
Geography of Argentina
List of Argentina-related topics
List of islands by area
List of islands by highest point
List of islands by population
List of islands in lakes
List of islands in the Atlantic Ocean
List of islands of South America

References

External links

Islands of Argentina @ United Nations Environment Programme

World island information @ WorldIslandInfo.com

 
Islands
Argentina